The 37th International Emmy Awards took place on November 23, 2009, in New York City was hosted by British television star Graham Norton. The award ceremony, presented by the International Academy of Television Arts and Sciences (IATAS), honors all TV programming produced and originally aired outside the United States.

Ceremony 
Nominations for the 37th International Emmy Awards were announced by International Academy of Television Arts and Sciences on October 5, 2009, at a press conference in Mipcom, in Cannes.  The United Kingdom leads with 9 nominations, followed by Brazil (5), Germany, Mexico and the Philippines (3). There are 41 nominees in 10 categories.

In addition to the presentation of the International Emmys for programming, the International Academy presented two special awards. Sir David Frost, received the 2009 Founders Award and Markus Schächter, Director General of Germany's ZDF, received the Directorate Award for his outstanding leadership of ZDF and to commemorate the 60th Anniversary of the founding of The Federal Republic of Germany.

Presenters 
The following individuals, listed in order of appearance, presented awards.

Winners and nominees

Most major nominations 
By country
 — 9
 — 5

By network
Rede Globo — 5
BBC — 4
Channel 4 — 4

Most major awards 
By country
 — 5

By network
BBC — 3
Channel 4 — 2

References

External links 
 International Academy of Television Arts & Sciences Official website
 2009 INTERNATIONAL EMMY® AWARD NOMINEES
 INTERNATIONAL EMMY AWARD WINNERS ANNOUNCED

International Emmy Awards ceremonies
2009 television awards
2009 in American television